The Seminole County Home is a historic site located at 300 Bush Boulevard in Sanford, Florida, United States, North America.

History
On June 10, 1999, the site was added to the National Register of Historic Places.

Museum of Seminole County History
The Museum of Seminole County History located at the site focuses on the history of Seminole County and includes exhibits on the area's Native American inhabitants, early settlers and military operations, the impact of railroads and steamships, local agriculture and industries, antiques, and historic artifacts.

References

External links
 Museum of Seminole County History at Florida's Office of Cultural and Historical Programs
 Sanford Historical Trail at Historic Hiking Trails
 http://www.seminolecountyfl.gov/departments-services/leisure-services/parks-recreation/museum-of-seminole-county-history/

Museums in Seminole County, Florida
National Register of Historic Places in Seminole County, Florida
Native American museums in Florida
History museums in Florida